The Judele is a right tributary of the river Râul Mare in Romania. It flows into the Râul Mare upstream from the Gura Apelor Dam.

References

Rivers of Romania
Rivers of Hunedoara County